The Ladies European Tour is a professional golf tour for women which was founded in 1978. It is based at Buckinghamshire Golf Club near London in England. Like many UK-based sports organisations it is a company limited by guarantee, a legal structure which enables it to focus on maximising returns to its members through prize money, rather than on making profits for investors. The tour is run by a board of directors and a Players' Council. Most of the players on the tour are European, with members from more than 40 countries internationally. The tour operates tournaments across five continents.

History
The U.S.-based LPGA was founded in 1950, but women's professional golf was slower to get established in Europe. In 1978 the Women's Professional Golfers' Association (WPGA) was formed as part of Professional Golfers' Association of Great Britain and Ireland. A tour was established the following year with Carlsberg as the main sponsor, supporting 12 36-hole tournaments, with several other tournaments including the Women's British Open on the schedule. For the first two seasons, the majority of tournaments were held over 36-holes; in 1981, that increased to 54-holes. Total prize money on the tour was planned to rise to £250,000 in 1981, from £80,000 in the inaugural season, but several tournaments and pro-ams were lost after sponsors withdrew.

Carlsberg ended their sponsorship after the 1981 season, and despite initial optimism, the tour experienced further problems during its fourth season in 1982 as several more events were cancelled. The circuit was left with just ten tournaments, from which few players could make a living, and the future of the WPGA was being questioned.

In 1988 the tour members decided to form an independent company, the Women Professional Golfers' European Tour Limited. This new company moved away from the PGA's headquarters at The Belfry and set up its own headquarters at the Tytherington Club in Cheshire. In 1998 the Tour changed its name to European Ladies' Professional Golf Association Limited and again in July 2000 to Ladies European Tour Limited. In 2008 the tour relocated to offices at the Buckinghamshire Golf Club, which is just outside London. In 2010, the LET Access Series (LETAS) was launched as the official development tour.

In January 2020, the Ladies European Tour entered into a joint venture arrangement with the LPGA Tour, with the stated aim of "increasing playing opportunities for female golfers in Europe". The board of directors of Ladies European Golf Venture Limited, which assumed control of the tour, includes high level representatives from the LPGA Tour, European Tour, and The R&A. The 2020 season is the first edition of the Race to Costa Del Sol.

Tournaments
Unlike in men's golf, the European and American tours do not share a common set of majors, although the Women's British Open and The Evian Championship are currently recognised as majors by both organisations.

The Ladies European Tour organises the Solheim Cup when in Europe and in 2011, the Tour received a boost when the European side won for The Cup for the fourth time on home soil at Killeen Castle in Ireland. The success continued when Europe earned an historic first away victory at Colorado Golf Club, winning The Cup for the fifth time in 2013. 

A record 26 official money events were scheduled for the 2008 season, which also saw the introduction of a new team competition called the European Ladies Golf Cup. Also, for the first time in several years, the LET scheduled an event opposite one of the LPGA's majors, with the ABN AMRO Open held opposite the LPGA Championship. The schedule dropped to 23 official money events in 2009, but increased to 25 for 2010. In both years, the Ladies Open of Portugal was scheduled opposite the LPGA Championship.

The 2016 schedule featured 21 events including the Olympic Golf Competition in Rio de Janeiro (the biennial Solheim Cup, held in odd-numbered years, is also an official LET event but will next be played in 2017 in Iowa). The total of events has been in steep decline since 2016; the peak was 28 in 2008. The two richest events by far are the two European Majors: The Evian Championship (historically the Evian Masters) and the Women's British Open. In 2016, 10 other events (in Australia, China, Morocco, England, Scotland, Germany, Abu Dhabi, Qatar, Japan and Dubai) had prize funds in excess of €450,000, with the remainder having prize funds of between €200,000 and €400,000. Total prize money from the 2016 events passed €14 million.

2023 schedule and results

Past tour schedules
Individual LET tournaments have purses fixed in a mixture of Australian dollars, British pounds, euro, New Zealand dollars and U.S. dollars, so year on year changes in the total prize fund reflect exchange rate fluctuations as well as prize fund movements in constant currencies.

Order of Merit and seasonal award winners
The Order of Merit is awarded to the leading money winner on the tour, though for some years in the past a points system was used. The Player's Player of the Year award is voted by the members of the Tour for the member they believe has contributed the most to the season on the Tour. The Rookie of the Year (known as the Bill Johnson Trophy from 1999 to 2003 and now the Ryder Cup Wales Rookie of the Year) is awarded to the leading first-year player on the Order of Merit rankings.

Notes

References

See also
Women's sports
List of golfers with most Ladies European Tour wins
Ladies European Tour records
Women's World Golf Rankings
Professional golf tours

External links
Official site of the Ladies European Tour

 
Professional golf tours
Sports leagues established in 1979
1979 establishments in Europe
Women's sport in London